Man of Tai Chi is a 2013 Chinese-American martial arts film directed by and starring Keanu Reeves in his directorial debut and co-starring Tiger Chen, Iko Uwais, Karen Mok, and Simon Yam. A multilingual film featuring dialogue in Mandarin, English and Hong Kong Cantonese, it revolves around a young martial artist who is pushed by the need of money to enter the world of underground fighting.

The film was released in China on 5 July 2013 and in the USA on 1 November 2013. Despite the critics praising Reeves's direction and the fight sequences, the film bombed at the box office.

Plot

HKPD officer Sun-Jing Shi leads an investigation into Security System Alliance (SSA), a private security firm owned by the mysterious Donaka Mark. Suspecting Donaka of hosting an illegal fighting operation, Sun-Jing turns one of his fighters into a mole who gets killed by him. Without any evidence, Superintendent Wong orders the case closed, but Sun-Jing secretly continues investigating. Donaka then sees Tiger, a young, working-class disciple of tai chi at a Wu Lin Wang Competition, gets impressed with his fighting skills and sends him a job offer at SSA. Tired of his menial courier job, Tiger flies to Hong Kong for the job interview which turns out to be a test of his combat ability. He passes the test and is welcomed by Donaka who offers him great financial rewards for joining his underground fighting ring. Tiger refuses as fighting for money would compromise his honor, and leaves. Soon after, land inspectors declare the tai chi temple belonging to Tiger's master structurally unsafe and plan to evict its occupants to demolish the temple for real estate development. Tiger seeks help from Qing Sha, a paralegal friend, and finds a means to save the temple through historic preservation and government protection. However, the need of money for repairing the temple  within a month's time prompts Tiger to accept Donaka's offer.

After each fight, which is a form of modern gladiatorial combat enjoyed by rich individuals, Tiger wins larger sums of money. He quits his job, buys his parents presents, and begins having the temple repaired. With time, Tiger develops a more efficient and brutal style. Noticing the change in him, Master Yang warns Tiger; however, intoxicated with the new life, Tiger ignores the warning. In the Wu Lin Competition, Tiger viciously injures his opponent and is disqualified. When Tiger comes back to train at the temple, a fight ensues and Master Yang is forced to use his internal Chi energies to palm-strike Tiger, reminding him that he is yet to completely master tai chi. Tiger ignores his advice to meditate, and finds out that the authority has rejected his petition to gain historical protection for the temple due to his actions at the Wu Lin Competition, which are against his temple's philosophy. An enraged Tiger demands a fight and Donaka has him face a mercenary named Uri Romanov. Using his rage, he quickly defeats Uri and almost kills him, but relents at the end. Donaka finishes off Uri. Realizing how much he has changed, Tiger declares his intention to stop participating in underground fighting and contacts Sun-Jing, unaware of the constant surveillance Donaka had put him under for a long time.

Donaka sets up a private tournament for a death match, in which Tiger is to participate. Sun-Jing trails Tiger's escort, but her car is run off the road. Surviving the crash, Sun-Jing calls for assistance and discovers Superintendent Wong had been working for Donaka. At the tournament, Donaka plays a video composed of surveillance footage, revealing how Tiger had been manipulated, "corrupted" and transformed from an innocent martial arts practitioner to a ruthless fighter. Tiger refuses to fight his assigned opponent, and challenges Donaka instead. The fight is interrupted by the HKPD, who storm the compound and arrest participants and audience. Fleeing from the scene, Donaka arrives at the temple and starts fighting with Tiger. Donaka initially has the upper hand, but Tiger re-embraces his tai chi training and manages to palm-strike Donaka despite getting stabbed. A dying Donaka smiles, pleased for having pushed Tiger to become a killer. Tiger and his master then reconcile, Sun-Jing gets promoted to Superintendent and Tiger reaches an agreement with both Qing Sha's law firm and the real estate developers. The government decides to protect the village and tourists are invited to visit and learn more about the 600-year history of the Ling Kong Temple. Tiger tells Qing-Sha that he intends to open his own tai chi school in the city to continue the legacy of the Ling Kong tai chi.

Cast
 Keanu Reeves as Donaka Mark, the film's main antagonist
 Tiger Chen as Tiger Chen Linhu
 Karen Mok as Sun Jing Shi
 Yu Hai as Master Yang
 Ye Qing as Qing Sha
 Simon Yam as Superintendent Wong
 Sam Lee as Tak Ming
 Michael Tong as Policeman Yuan
 Iko Uwais as Gilang Sanjaya
 Silvio Simac as Uri Romanov
 Yoo Seung-jun

Production

Pre-production began in 2008 with years-long script refinements. When the project eventually moved into the production phase, principal photography occurred on mainland China and Hong Kong.

Release
The film received an R rating from the MPAA, although Reeves said it was shot with the intention of a PG-13 rating.

The film premiered in 2013 with showings at the Beijing Film Festival and Cannes Film Festival. It was also scheduled to be shown at the 2013 Toronto International Film Festival. It became available for purchase on 27 September 2013 via the iTunes Store (VOD) video on demand, and had its theatrical release in the US on 1 November 2013.

Reception
The film premiered at the 2013 Beijing International Film Festival, where it received praise from action film director John Woo. Rotten Tomatoes reported that 71% of critics have given the film a positive review based on 68 reviews, with an average rating of 6.10/10. The site's critics consensus reads, "It may not be groundbreaking, but Man of Tai Chi represents an agreeably old-fashioned picture for martial arts fans – and a solid debut for first-time director Keanu Reeves." On Metacritic, the film has a weighted average score of 52 out of 100 based on 22 critic reviews, indicating "mixed or average reviews".

Robert Abele of the Los Angeles Times called it "a movie streamlined to evoke the timeless zip of martial arts movies past" and praised the "refreshingly grounded and old-school kinetic" action. Sheila O'Malley, writing at RogerEbert.com, also praised the "thrilling immediacy" of the fight scenes: "you realize you are actually seeing these guys actually do this, as opposed to watching something pieced together later in the editing room". Dave McGinn of the Globe and Mail, in contrast, called the film "ambitious but generic" and filled with "stale conventions".

Despite the favorable reviews, the movie was a box office bomb. Having grossed US$5.5 million against a budget of US$25 million.

See also
 List of martial arts films

References

External links

 
 

2013 films
American action drama films
American martial arts films
2010s Cantonese-language films
Chinese action films
Chinese martial arts films
2010s English-language films
English-language Chinese films
Films directed by Keanu Reeves
Films set in Beijing
Films set in Macau
Films set in Hong Kong
IMAX films
Universal Pictures films
Underground fighting films
2013 action drama films
2013 martial arts films
Chinese multilingual films
American multilingual films
2013 multilingual films
Martial arts tournament films
2013 directorial debut films
Tai chi films
2010s Mandarin-language films
2010s American films